The Tsereteli station is situated intermediate on Saburtalo Line in Tbilisi, Georgia. It's named after Georgian singer Khatia Tsereteli.

Railway stations opened in 1979
Tbilisi Metro stations
1979 establishments in Georgia (country)